Greatest Hits Volume III is the second greatest hits album from American singer songwriter  Billy Joel. The volume follows Greatest Hits – Volume I & Volume II and includes hits from 1983 to 1997. Two previously unreleased studio tracks are included, "To Make You Feel My Love" and "Hey Girl", while the third new track, "Light as the Breeze", was originally recorded for a Leonard Cohen tribute album known as Tower of Song in 1995. All three tracks are new songs of cover materials (a rare occurrence in his catalogue).

Commercially, the collection paled in comparison to the first two greatest hits volumes, only achieving platinum status. 

Chronologically, Greatest Hits Volume III continues from where Volume II left off, as the first two tracks, "Keeping the Faith" and "An Innocent Man", first appeared on his album An Innocent Man.

Track listing
All songs written by Billy Joel except where noted.

Personnel
Billy Joel – keyboards, acoustic piano, Hammond B-3, Fender Rhodes, synthesizers, clavinet, accordion, harpsichord, harmonica, electric guitar, lead and backing vocals
Bob Bailey, Kim Fleming, Yvonne Hodges, Donna McElroy, Chris Rodriguez, Trisha Yearwood, Alex Brown, Jackie Gouche, Monalisa Young, Wrecia Ford, Marion Saunders, B. David Whitworth, Frank and George Simms, Patricia Darcy Jones, Frank Floyd, Mick Jones, Joe Lynn Turner, Ian Lloyd, Chuck Arnold (and members of the Hicksville High School Chorus) – background vocals
Emory Gordy Jr., David Brown, Russell Javors, Dean Parks, Joey Hunting, Mike Tyler, Danny Kortchmar, Tommy Byrnes, Phillip Nowlam, Bob Mann, Dann Huff, Mac McAnally – guitars
Paul Franklin – pedal steel ("Light as the Breeze")
Matt Rollings, Ray Charles – acoustic piano
Steve Nathan – organ
Robbie Kondor, Randy Waldman – keyboards
John Mahoney – keyboards, keyboard programming
Kevin Jones – keyboard programming
Jeff Jacobs, Jeff Bova – synthesizers
Doug Stegmeyer, Neil Stubenhaus, Schuyler Deale, T. M. Stevens, Chuck Treece, Jeff Lee Johnson, Will Lee, Willie Weeks, Randy D. Jackson – bass guitar
Liberty DeVitto, Vinnie Colaiuta, Zachary Alford, Shawn Pelton – drums
Crystal Taliefero – percussion, backing vocals
Mark Rivera – percussion, alto and tenor saxophones
Michael Brecker – tenor sax
Ronnie Cutler – baritone sax

Certifications

References

Billy Joel compilation albums
1997 greatest hits albums
Albums produced by Mick Jones (Foreigner)
Albums produced by Phil Ramone
Columbia Records compilation albums